George Bates may refer to:

George Bates (physician) (1608–1668), physician to Oliver Cromwell and to Charles II, Fellow of the Royal Society, author
George Bates (Australian footballer) (1914–1983), Australian rules footballer
George Bates (English footballer) (1923–1995), English footballer
George J. Bates (1891–1949), U.S. Representative from Massachusetts
George E. Bates (bishop) (1933–1999), bishop of the Episcopal Diocese of Utah
George Hubert Bates (1884–1978), State Treasurer of Missouri
George Latimer Bates (1863–1940), American naturalist
George E. Bates (professor) (1902–1992), American professor of investment management
George Bates (wheelchair basketball) (born 1994), British wheelchair basketball player